Real Oviedo is a Spanish football club based in Oviedo, Asturias. Founded on 26 March 1926 as a result of the merger of two clubs who had maintained a large sporting rivalry for years in the city: Real Stadium Club Ovetense and Real Club Deportivo Oviedo. The club plays in the Segunda División, the second tier of the Spanish football league system.
The club plays in blue shirts and white shorts in the Estadio Carlos Tartiere, which seats 30,500 spectators, opened on 30 September 2000, and is the largest sports stadium in Asturias. In the all-time league table for the Spanish top division, Oviedo ranks in 18th
place.

Its local rivals are Sporting Gijón on the sea coast to its north, with whom the club contests the Asturian derby.

History
Founded in 1926 after a merger of Stadium Ovetense and Real Club Deportivo Oviedo. The first one was founded by young people who had studied in England, where the "foot-ball" was already popular. And the second club was founded a few years later by a split in the first. Oviedo first reached La Liga seven years later.

Their attacking quartet of Emilín, Galé, Herrerita and Isidro Lángara (all represented Spain in this period), as well as Casuco and Ricardo Gallart modernised the game with their pace and running off the ball tied with sharp passing and one-touch football, played in a style 30/40 years before its time, being dubbed Delanteras Eléctricas ("The electric forwards"); all this was connected with a rigid training and fitness regime started by a former manager of the club, Englishman Fred Pentland. Lángara won the Pichichi Trophy three years in a row prior to the Spanish Civil War, as Oviedo broke all scoring records (174 goals in 62 league games). With the outbreak of the conflict, however, the team broke up: Lángara emigrated to South America, Herrerita and Emilín signed with FC Barcelona, Galé with Racing de Santander and Gallart with Racing de Ferrol.

When football in the country resumed in 1939, Oviedo could not play 1939–40 season, as their pitch was deemed unplayable – Francisco Franco's troops had used the stadium as an ammunition dump. During the following decades, the club bounced back between the first and second levels, the high point being a best-ever third position in 1962–63 (ranking joint-first with Real Madrid after the first 15 rounds), while the lowest was the side's first relegation to Segunda División B, in 1978 (for a single season).

With the FIFA World Cup to be held on home soil in 1982, the Carlos Tartiere Stadium was completely renewed, the first match being held with the Chile national team, 0–0. In 1984–85 Oviedo won the soon-to-be-defunct Spanish League Cup (second division), after successively defeating UD Salamanca, Bilbao Athletic, CF Lorca Deportiva, CE Sabadell FC and Atlético Madrileño (the latter with a 2–1 aggregate in the final).

In 1988 Oviedo returned to the top division, after ousting RCD Mallorca in the promotion playoffs (2–1 on aggregate, with striker Carlos, who would feature prominently for the club in the following years, scoring one of the goals), and remained in that level for 13 consecutive seasons – in 1990–91 it finished sixth, qualifying for the first time for Europe, and being knocked out in the first round by Genoa C.F.C. of Italy (2–3). Oviedo bounced back from that defeat immediately, with a 2–1 win at the Camp Nou over Barcelona.After that successful year, there were more brilliant seasons and others where relegation was narrowly dodged (in 1998 Real Oviedo succeeded in a relegation playoff to stay up after beating UD Las Palmas). In a nutshell, the Carbayones had an outstanding run in La Liga during the 1990s with a team which lined up top international players. In 1992 Real Oviedo as well as most Spanish football clubs was forced to become public limited sports company. The initial capital stock for Real Oviedo amounted to €3.6 million.

On 4 October 1995, Real Oviedo played its 1,000th game in La Liga.

In 2000, the new Carlos Tartiere Stadium with 30,500 seats became Real Oviedo's new ground. It was officially opened on 20 September 2000 with a match between Real Oviedo and Partizan Belgrade, where Real Oviedo lost 0–2 to the Serbian side. Three days before, Real Oviedo and UD Las Palmas had got a 2–2 draw on the first fixture in the 2000–01 season.

After being relegated two consecutive times, Real Oviedo suffered severe economic troubles, which, when coupled with a profound lack of institutional support from the city's government, resulted in the team's inability to pay its players. The club was then forced to drop all the way to the fourth division of Spanish football, for the 2003–04 season; at this point the team nearly folded but eventually recovered and regrouped, returning to level three in the following campaign.

Oviedo lasted two further campaigns before dropping down a level again. In another playoff against a Mallorca team – this time the reserves, the club returned again to the third division, after a penalty shootout; however, its survival remained at risk in the following years, due to continuing financial difficulties.

The financial dire straits continued into the 2012–13 season, when Oviedo called on supporters to buy shares in the club. A few footballers, notably Santi Cazorla, Juan Mata, Michu and Adrián who all started their careers there, offered their financial support in an attempt to save the club from bankruptcy – the club had until 17 November to raise €2 million in order to prevent closure.

On 17 November 2012, Carlos Slim, at the time the richest person in the world, invested $2.5 million in the club, therefore gaining a controlling stake.

On 31 May 2015, Oviedo confirmed their return to the Spanish Segunda División after a thirteen-year absence with a 2–1 aggregate victory over Cádiz in the 2015 Segunda División B play-offs.

Season to season

38 seasons in La Liga
40 seasons in Segunda División
9 seasons in Segunda División B
4 seasons in Tercera División

European history

Current squad
The numbers are established according to the official website: www.realoviedo.es

Reserve team

Out on loan

Current technical staff

Honours

Segunda División
 Winners (5): 1932–33, 1951–52, 1957–58, 1971–72, 1974–75
Copa de la Liga (Segunda División)
 Winners: 1984–85
Segunda División B
 Winners: 2014–15
Tercera División 
 Winners (4): 2003–04, 2004–05, 2007–08, 2008–09

Individual

Pichichi Trophy
La Liga: Isidro Lángara (3) (1933–34, 1934–35, 1935–36), Marianín (1972–73)
Segunda División: Isidro Lángara (1932–33), Eduardo Gómez "Lalo" (1957–58), Galán (1971–72), Carlos (1987–88), Borja Bastón (2021–22)
Segunda División B: Miguel Linares (2014–15)
Tercera División: Diego Cervero (3) (2004–05, 2007–08, 2008–09)

Zamora Trophy
Segunda División: Óscar Álvarez (2) (1931–32, 1932–33), Lombardía (1971–72)
Tercera División: Rafael Ponzo (2003–04), Oinatz Aulestia (2008–09)

Notable former players
Note: this list includes players that have appeared in at least 100 league games and/or have reached international status.

Personnel

Management 

{| class="wikitable"
|-
! Office
! Name
|-
|President
| Martín Peláez
|-
|Counselor
| Jorge Menéndez Vallina
|-
|Counselor
| Manuel Paredes González
|-
|Counselor
| Fernando Corral Mestas
|-
|Institutional relations
| César Martín Villar

|-

Coaches

Rivalries
The Asturian derby has been closely contested throughout its history and the two teams have met 117 times in all competitions. Real Oviedo have won 49 times, while Sporting de Gijón have done so in 38 games; 30 draws have been produced.

Sporting won the first match ever played, a 2–1 win for the Regional Championships on 6 December 1926. The first top flight derby took place during the 1944–45 season, and honours were split over the two games: Oviedo won its home fixture 2–1, but lost by a record 0–6 at El Molinón.

The inaugural second level season, 1929, also brought two local derbies – Oviedo thrashed Sporting 6–2 at home, while Sporting won 3–2 in the return fixture. On 15 March 1998, the last contest in the top level took place, and Oviedo emerged victorious 2–1 at the Tartiere, eventually managing to stay afloat (only through the play-offs though) whilst the Rojiblancos suffered direct relegation as 20th and last.

Supporters
After the first relegation in its history to Tercera División, 2003–04 season, the historical record of the category was established with 10,759 season ticket holders, up to that time, the record was for Málaga CF in 1995 with 4,200.

Real Oviedo achieved its season ticket holders record in the 2017–18 season with 20.796 people.

Real Oviedo supporters maintain friendly relations with fans of Deportivo La Coruña, Real Valladolid and Sevilla and internationally with fans of Genoa and Žilina.

Sponsorships and manufacturers

Real Oviedo B

The reserve team, which plays since 2018 in the third level (Segunda B), was formerly named Vetusta. Vetusta was also the original name of the team, before the Royal Spanish Football Federation decree which banned unique reserve club names in the early 1990s.

Real Oviedo (women)

On 28 August 2017, women's club Oviedo Moderno CF signed an agreement with Real Oviedo for using their name and their blue and white colors, instead of their classic black and green, since the 2017–18 season, with the aim to be completely integrated into the structure of the club for the 2018–19 season onwards. The club formerly used the blue and white colors for the 2016–17 promotion play-offs.

Oviedo currently plays in second level.

References

External links

 
Futbolme team profile 
Club magazine  
Club blog 
Oviedín, fansite  

 
Football clubs in Asturias
Association football clubs established in 1926
Segunda División clubs
1926 establishments in Spain
O
La Liga clubs